Patrick MacNicholas (1780 – 1852) was an Irish Roman Catholic clergyman who served as Bishop of Achonry from 1818 until his death.

MacNicholas was ordained in 1804. He was buried at the Old Cemetery, Ballaghaderreen but then re-interred at St Nathy's.

References

1780 births
1852 deaths
19th-century Roman Catholic bishops in Ireland
Roman Catholic bishops of Achonry